Bar Bez Granic is the third local season of the reality The Bar in Poland.

Synopsis
Start Date: 13 September 2003.
End Date: 20 December 2003.
Duration: 99 days.
Contestants:
The Finalists: Maciej (The Winner) & Damian (Runner-up).
Evicted Contestants: Agnieszka F, Agnieszka T, Aldek, Amanda, Edyta, Iwona F, Iwona S, Julia, Krzysztof K, Krzysztof Z, Leszek, Magda D, Magda S, Marco, Paweł, Rafał, Tadeusz, Ting Ting, Weronika.
Voluntary Exits: Iwona G & Magda M.
Ejected Contestants: Adrian.

Contestants

Nominations

References

2003 Polish television seasons